Hermann Alexander Schlögl (22 July 1932 – 14 January 2023) was a German actor and Egyptologist.

Biography
Born in Munich on 22 July 1932, Hermann was the youngest son of politician  and the brother of historian . He studied literature and theatre at the Ludwig Maximilian University of Munich, while at the same time taking acting lessons. He started off as an actor at the Theater Ulm and at the Wuppertaler Bühnen.

Schlögl began studying Egyptology, archeology, and ancient history and graduated from the University of Basel in 1976 with the thesis Der Gott auf der Blüte. He directed the Swiss Bank Corporation's exhibition "Geschenk des Nils", which was shown at various museums across Switzerland for two years. He taught at the University of Fribourg from 1980 to 2000.

Schlögl died in Basel on 14 January 2023, at the age of 90.

Publications
Echnaton – Tutanchamun. Fakten und Texte (1983)
Amenophis IV. Echnaton. Mit Selbstzeugnissen und Bilddokumenten (1986)
Altägyptische Totenfiguren aus öffentlichen und privaten Sammlungen der Schweiz (1990)
Uschebti. Arbeiter im Ägyptischen Totenreich (1993)
Ramses II. Mit Selbstzeugnissen und Bilddokumenten (1993)
Gärten der Liebe. Lyrik aus der Zeit der Pharaonen (2000)
Corpus der ägyptischen Totenfiguren der öffentlichen Sammlungen Krakaus (2000)
Der Teufel hole die Kunst. Briefe von Lesser Ury an einen Freund (2000)
Das alte Ägypten (2003)
Das thebanische Grab Nr. 136 und der Beginn der Amarna-Zeit (2005)
Egipskie figurki grobowe (2006)
Die Weisheit Ägyptens (2007)
Echnaton (2008)
Nofretete. Die Wahrheit über die schöne Königin (2012)

References

External Links
 

1932 births
2023 deaths
German actors
German Egyptologists
Male actors from Munich
Ludwig Maximilian University of Munich alumni
University of Basel alumni
Academic staff of the University of Fribourg